Petra Horneber (April 21, 1965) is a German sport shooter. She won the Silver medal in the  10 m air rifle in the 1996 Summer Olympics in Atlanta.

References

1965 births
Living people
German female sport shooters
ISSF rifle shooters
Shooters at the 1996 Summer Olympics
Shooters at the 2000 Summer Olympics
Olympic shooters of Germany
Olympic silver medalists for Germany
Olympic medalists in shooting
Medalists at the 1996 Summer Olympics
20th-century German women